"Superstitious" is a 1988 single released by the Swedish rock band Europe. It was the first single released from the album Out of This World. It charted at #31 in the Billboard Hot 100, #9 at the Mainstream Rock Tracks and #34 in the UK Singles Chart. It was the last song by Europe to chart in the US.

The video for "Superstitious" was filmed at Castle Gould, on Long Island, New York. When performing the song live, Europe often include a part of Bob Marley's "No Woman, No Cry" in the middle of the song.

Personnel
Joey Tempest − lead vocals
Kee Marcello − guitars, background vocals
John Levén − bass guitar
Mic Michaeli − pianos, background vocals
Ian Haugland − drums, background vocals

Chart positions

References

1988 singles
Europe (band) songs
Number-one singles in Norway
Number-one singles in Sweden
Songs written by Joey Tempest
Song recordings produced by Ron Nevison
1988 songs
Epic Records singles